State Route 180 (SR 180) is a   state highway that serves as a west-to-east highway in Baldwin County, and travels between the cities of Fort Morgan and Orange Beach. It, along with State Route 182, is one of two state routes in the southern part of the county between the Intracoastal Waterway and the Gulf of Mexico. It goes through Gulf Shores, but the route does not reach the Florida border.

Route description
State Route 180 begins at the Mobile Bay Ferry at Fort Morgan. From this point, the route travels in an easterly course paralleling the shoreline of the Gulf of Mexico through both Gulf Shores and Orange Beach en route to its eastern terminus at East Oak Ridge Drive.

Major intersections

References

180
Transportation in Baldwin County, Alabama